Dorte Juul Jensen (born 1957) is a senior scientist and head of the Center for Fundamental Research: Metal Structures in Four Dimensions and Materials Research Division, Risø DTU National Laboratory for Sustainable Energy, Roskilde, Denmark. Risø operates under the auspices of the Danish Ministry of Science, Technology and Innovation, researching a wide range of technologies and training Ph.D candidates in the sciences.

Jensen's research involves advancing knowledge of the physical characteristics of metal structures. She has pioneered new experimental techniques based on neutron diffraction, electron microscopy, and synchrotron x-ray diffraction.

Home life 
Dorte Juul Jensen was born January 30, 1957, in Birkerød, Denmark. She is a daughter of Per and Jutta (Hartvig) Justesen. She married Jens Christian Juul-Jensen, August 29, 1981, and they have two children.

Work life 
After earning her Ph.d. in Civil Engineering, she was appointed chair of the Research Forum by the then minister of Research.

Since 1983 Juul-Jensen has been a researcher at Risø National Laboratory, first as a scientist, then from 1994 as a senior scientist.

Juul-Jensen is also an editor of the journal Scripta Materialia, an international journal of material science, and she has co-authored a book, Electron Backscatter Diffraction in Materials Science (Kluwer Academic/Plenum Publishers, New York, New York 2000).

Publications 
Dorte Juul Jensen has published over 450 scientific articles. Here are a few of them:

 An experimentally-based molecular dynamics analysis of grain boundary migration during recrystallization in aluminum
 Development of microstructure in FCC metals during cold work 
 Impact of 3D/4D methods on the understanding of recrystallization

Awards and achievements 

 In 1997, Juul-Jensen became the first woman to be awarded the degree of Dr. Techn. in Denmark.
 In 1998, she was awarded a Tagea Brandt Rejselegat.
 In 1999, she was the first woman to receive the Statoil Prize (Statoil Prisen) for her work.
 In 2016, she received the prestigious CS Smith Award for the ground-breaking results she achieved using 3D techniques.
 In 2022, she received and ERC PoC grant to further develop the instrument to look into the internal structures of the metals in four dimensions
 In 2022, she also received the Villum Kann Rasmussen Annual Award in Science and Technology for her research into the internal microstructures and properties of metals.

References

External links
 Risø National Laboratory  
 Statoil Prisen

Danish metallurgists
Danish science writers
Living people
Academic journal editors
Danish women scientists
Danish women physicists
Fellows of the Minerals, Metals & Materials Society
1957 births